Newcastle University Football Club is a football club based in Newcastle upon Tyne, Tyne and Wear, England.

History
Newcastle University joined the Northern Alliance in the 1970s, leaving the league after finishing bottom in the 1978–79 season. In 1988, the club rejoined the Northern Alliance league system, being placed in Division One. In the 1991–1992 season, Newcastle University were relegated to Division Two, gaining promotion back to Division One in 1997. In 2000, Newcastle University gained promotion to the Northern Alliance Premier Division. After relegation and promotion in 2010 and 2016 respectively, Newcastle University won the 2017–18 Northern Football Alliance, dropping points in just five games out of thirty. Newcastle University entered the FA Vase for the first time in 2019–20.

Ground
The club currently groundshare with Prudhoe Youth Club at Kimberley Park, having previously played at Cochrane Park in Newcastle.

Records
 Best FA Vase performance: First Round proper, 2020-21, 2022-23
 Best League performance: 11th place in Northern League Division 2 (Tier 10), 2021-22

Honours
 Northern Football Alliance Premier Division (Tier 11) 
 Winners: 2017-18

References

External links

Newcastle University
Football clubs in England
Football clubs in Tyne and Wear
Sport in Newcastle upon Tyne
Northern Football League
University and college football clubs in England
Prudhoe